In functional analysis, the weak operator topology, often abbreviated WOT, is the weakest topology on the set of bounded operators on a Hilbert space , such that the functional sending an operator  to the complex number  is continuous for any vectors  and  in the Hilbert space.

Explicitly, for an operator  there is base of neighborhoods of the following type: choose a finite number of vectors , continuous functionals , and positive real constants  indexed by the same finite set . An operator  lies in the neighborhood if and only if  for all .

Relationship with other topologies on B(H)

Strong operator topology

Because the inner product is a continuous function, the SOT is stronger than WOT. The following example shows that this inclusion is strict. Let  and consider the sequence  of unilateral shifts. An application of Cauchy-Schwarz shows that  in WOT.

The linear functionals on the set of bounded operators on a Hilbert space that are continuous in the strong operator topology are precisely those that are continuous in the WOT (actually, the WOT is the weakest operator topology that leaves continuous all strongly continuous linear functionals on the set  of bounded operators on the Hilbert space H). Because of this fact, the closure of a convex set of operators in the WOT is the same as the closure of that set in the SOT.

Weak-star operator topology

The predual of B(H) is the trace class operators C1(H), and it generates the w*-topology on B(H), called the weak-star operator topology or σ-weak topology. The weak-operator and σ-weak topologies agree on norm-bounded sets in B(H).

A net {Tα} ⊂ B(H) converges to T in WOT if and only Tr(TαF) converges to Tr(TF) for all finite-rank operator F. Since every finite-rank operator is trace-class, this implies that WOT is weaker than the σ-weak topology. To see why the claim is true, recall that every finite-rank operator F is a finite sum 

So {Tα} converges to T in WOT means 

Extending slightly, one can say that the weak-operator and σ-weak topologies agree on norm-bounded sets in B(H): Every trace-class operator is of the form 

where the series  converges. For every trace-class S, 

by invoking, for instance, the dominated convergence theorem.

Therefore every norm-bounded set is compact in WOT, by the Banach–Alaoglu theorem.

Other properties

The adjoint operation T → T*, as an immediate consequence of its definition, is continuous in WOT.

Multiplication is not jointly continuous in WOT: again let  be the unilateral shift. Appealing to Cauchy-Schwarz, one has that both Tn and T*n converges to 0 in WOT. But T*nTn is the identity operator for all . (Because WOT coincides with the σ-weak topology on bounded sets, multiplication is not jointly continuous in the σ-weak topology.)

However, a weaker claim can be made: multiplication is separately continuous in WOT. If a net Ti → T in WOT, then STi → ST and TiS → TS in WOT.

SOT and WOT on B(X,Y) when X and Y are normed spaces

In this case, each pair  and  defines a seminorm  on  via the rule .

The space  is a locally convex topological vector space when endowed with the WOT.

Thus, a topological base for the SOT is given by open neighborhoods of the form 

 

where as before  is a finite set, and

Relationships between different topologies on B(X,Y)

The different terminology for the various topologies on  can sometimes be confusing. And while the WOT is formally weaker than the SOT, the SOT is weaker than the operator norm topology.

In general, the following inclusions hold: 

 

For example, 

Consequently, if  is convex then 

 

in other words, SOT-closure and WOT-closure coincide for convex sets.

See also

 
 
 

Topological vector spaces
Topology of function spaces